Theodore C. Gass was a politician in Florida. He served as a county commissioner in Alachua County and in the Florida House of Representatives from 1871 to 1875. He also served as a councilman in Gainesville from 187 until 1879 and again from 1881 until 1885.

He was born 1833 or 1836/7 in South Carolina.

In 1871 and 1872 he represented Alachua County along with William K. Cessna in the Florida House of Representatives. In 1873, 1874 and 1875 he represented Alachua County along with George Washington.

See also
 African-American officeholders during and following the Reconstruction era

References

Members of the Florida House of Representatives
African-American politicians during the Reconstruction Era
Year of birth uncertain
County commissioners in Florida
African-American state legislators in Florida
People from Gainesville, Florida
African-American city council members in Florida
1830s births